Chaunggan is a village on the Chindwin River in Homalin Township, Hkamti District, in the Sagaing Region of northwestern Burma. It is located next to Thaungdut.

References

External links
Maplandia World Gazetteer

Populated places in Hkamti District
Homalin Township